Pelicinus is a genus of spiders in the family Oonopidae. It was first described in 1892 by Simon. , it contains 21 species.

Species
Pelicinus comprises the following species:
 Pelicinus amrishi (Makhan & Ezzatpanah, 2011) — Iran
 Pelicinus churchillae Platnick, Dupérré, Ott, Baehr & Kranz-Baltensperger, 2012 — Solomon Is.
 Pelicinus damieu Platnick, Dupérré, Ott, Baehr & Kranz-Baltensperger, 2012 — New Caledonia
 Pelicinus deelemanae Platnick, Dupérré, Ott, Baehr & Kranz-Baltensperger, 2012 — Thailand
 Pelicinus duong Platnick, Dupérré, Ott, Baehr & Kranz-Baltensperger, 2012 — Vietnam
 Pelicinus johor Platnick, Dupérré, Ott, Baehr & Kranz-Baltensperger, 2012 — Malaysia
 Pelicinus khao Platnick, Dupérré, Ott, Baehr & Kranz-Baltensperger, 2012 — Thailand
 Pelicinus koghis Platnick, Dupérré, Ott, Baehr & Kranz-Baltensperger, 2012 — New Caledonia
 Pelicinus lachivala Platnick, Dupérré, Ott, Baehr & Kranz-Baltensperger, 2012 — India
 Pelicinus madurai Platnick, Dupérré, Ott, Baehr & Kranz-Baltensperger, 2012 — India
 Pelicinus marmoratus Simon, 1892 (type) — Tropical Asia. Introduced to Pacific Is., Caribbean, Brazil, Canary Is., Kenya, Seychelles
 Pelicinus monteithi Platnick, Dupérré, Ott, Baehr & Kranz-Baltensperger, 2012 — New Caledonia
 Pelicinus penang Platnick, Dupérré, Ott, Baehr & Kranz-Baltensperger, 2012 — Malaysia
 Pelicinus raveni Platnick, Dupérré, Ott, Baehr & Kranz-Baltensperger, 2012 — Fiji
 Pelicinus saaristoi Ott & Harvey, 2008 — Australia (Western Australia)
 Pelicinus sayam Platnick, Dupérré, Ott, Baehr & Kranz-Baltensperger, 2012 — Thailand
 Pelicinus schwendingeri Platnick, Dupérré, Ott, Baehr & Kranz-Baltensperger, 2012 — Thailand, China
 Pelicinus sengleti Platnick, Dupérré, Ott, Baehr & Kranz-Baltensperger, 2012 — Iran
 Pelicinus snooky Ranasinghe & Benjamin, 2018 — Sri Lanka
 Pelicinus tham Platnick, Dupérré, Ott, Baehr & Kranz-Baltensperger, 2012 — Laos
 Pelicinus tumpy Ranasinghe & Benjamin, 2018 — Sri Lanka

References

Oonopidae
Araneomorphae genera
Spiders of Asia
Spiders of Oceania